Glen Elgin distillery is a Scotch single malt whisky distillery in Fogwatt, Moray, Scotland.

The distilery was founded in 1898, and is now owned by Diageo.

The whisky produced is used in White Horse blends and since 1977 in single malt whisky.

References

Scottish malt whisky
Diageo brands
Distilleries in Scotland
1898 establishments in Scotland